Charles Townshend, 2nd Viscount Townshend, (18 April 167421 June 1738) was an English Whig statesman. He served for a decade as Secretary of State for the Northern Department, 1714–1717, 1721–1730. He directed British foreign policy in close collaboration with his brother-in-law, prime minister Robert Walpole. He was often known as Turnip Townshend because of his strong interest in farming turnips and his role in the British Agricultural Revolution.

Early life
Townshend was the eldest son of Sir Horatio Townshend, 3rd Baronet, who was created Baron Townshend in 1661 and Viscount Townshend in 1682. The old Norfolk family of Townshend, to which he belonged, is descended from Sir Roger Townshend (d. 1493) of Raynham, who acted as legal advisor to the Paston family, and was made a justice of the common pleas in 1484. His descendant, another Sir Roger Townshend (c. 1543–1590), had a son Sir John Townshend (1564–1603), a soldier, whose son, Sir Roger Townshend (1588– 1637), was created a baronet in 1617. He was the father of Sir Horatio Townshend.

Born at Raynham Hall, Norfolk, Townshend succeeded to the peerages in December 1687, and was educated at Eton College and King's College, Cambridge. He had Tory sympathies when he took his seat in the House of Lords, but his views changed, and he began to take an active part in politics as a Whig. For a few years after the accession of Queen Anne he remained without office, but in November 1708 he was appointed Captain of the Yeomen of the Guard, having in the previous year been summoned to the Privy Council. He was ambassador extraordinary and plenipotentiary to the States-General from 1709 to 1711, taking part during these years in the negotiations which preceded the conclusion of the Treaty of Utrecht.

He was elected a Fellow of the Royal Society in April 1706.

Secretary of State and other posts

After his recall to England, he was busily occupied in attacking the proceedings of the new Tory ministry. Townshend quickly won the favour of George I, and in September 1714, the new king selected him as Secretary of State for the Northern Department. The policy of Townshend and his colleagues, after they had crushed the Jacobite rising of 1715, both at home and abroad, was one of peace. The secretary disliked the interference of Britain in the war between Sweden and Denmark, and he promoted the conclusion of defensive alliances between Britain and the emperor and Britain and France.

In spite of these successes the influence of the Whigs was gradually undermined by the intrigues of Charles Spencer, 3rd Earl of Sunderland, and by the discontent of the Hanoverian favourites. In October 1716, Townshend's colleague, James Stanhope afterwards 1st Earl Stanhope, accompanied the king on his visit to Hanover, and while there he was seduced from his allegiance to his fellow ministers by Sunderland, George being led to believe that Townshend and his brother-in-law, Sir Robert Walpole, were caballing with the Prince of Wales, their intention being that the prince should supplant his father on the throne. Consequently, in December 1716 the secretary was dismissed and was made Lord Lieutenant of Ireland, but he only retained this post until the following April. When he was dismissed for voting against the government, he was joined by his brother-in-law Robert Walpole and other Whig Allies. This began the Whig Split which would divide the dominant party until 1720, with the opposition Whigs joining with the Tories to defeat Stanhope's government over several issues including the Peerage Bill of 1719.

Early in 1720 a partial reconciliation took place between the parties of Stanhope and Townshend, and in June of this year the latter became Lord President of the Council, a post which he held until February 1721, when, after the death of Stanhope and the forced retirement of Sunderland, a result of the South Sea Bubble, he was again appointed secretary of state for the northern department, with Walpole as First Lord of the Treasury and Chancellor of the Exchequer. The two remained in power during the remainder of the reign of George I the chief domestic events of the time being the impeachment of Bishop Atterbury, the pardon and partial restoration of Lord Bolingbroke, and the troubles in Ireland caused by the patent permitting Wood to coin halfpence.

Townshend secured the dismissal of his rival, Lord Carteret, afterwards Earl Granville, but soon differences arose between himself and Walpole, and he had some difficulty in steering a course through the troubled sea of European politics. Although disliking him, George II retained him in office, but the predominance in the ministry passed gradually but surely from him to Walpole. Townshend could not brook this. So long, to use Walpole's witty remark, as the firm was Townshend and Walpole all went well with it, but when the positions were reversed jealousies arose between the partners. Serious differences of opinion concerning the policy to be adopted towards Austria and in foreign politics generally led to a final rupture in 1730. Failing, owing to Walpole's interference, in his efforts to procure the dismissal of a colleague and his replacement by a personal friend, Townshend retired on 15 May 1730. His departure removed the final obstacle to the conclusion of an Anglo-Austrian Alliance which would become the centrepiece of British foreign policy until 1756.

According to historians Linda Frey and Marsha Frey:
Townshend was undoubtedly capable, determined, and hard-working, but in achieving his goals he sometimes appeared blunt, abrasive, stubborn, impatient, and overbearing. In contrast to many of his contemporaries whose venality was legendary he was scrupulously honest. He was generous to both friend and foe. He was also a passionate man who loved and hated quickly and rarely changed his mind once an opinion had been formed....Historians have often underrated Townshend's accomplishments in part because his rival Walpole outmanoeuvred and outlasted him.

"Turnip" Townshend
His remaining years were passed at Raynham, where he interested himself in agriculture. He promoted the adoption of the Norfolk four-course system, involving the rotation of turnips, barley, clover, and wheat crops. He was an enthusiastic advocate of growing turnips as a field crop for livestock feed. As a result of his promotion of turnip-growing and his agricultural experiments at Raynham, he became known as "Turnip Townshend".  (Alexander Pope mentions "Townshend's turnips" in Imitations of Horace, Epistle II.)  Townshend is often mentioned, together with Jethro Tull, Robert Bakewell, and others, as a major figure in England's "Agricultural Revolution", contributing to the adoption of agricultural practices that led to the increase in Britain's population between 1700 and 1850.

He died at Raynham on 21 June 1738.

Family

Townshend was twice married—first to the Hon. Elizabeth Pelham (1681–1711), daughter of Thomas Pelham, 1st Baron Pelham of Laughton and his first wife Elizabeth, daughter of Sir William Jones of Ramsbury Manor, Attorney General for England and Wales.

Children with the Hon. Elizabeth Pelham:
 Hon. Elizabeth Townshend (d. 1 December 1785) married Charles Cornwallis, 1st Earl Cornwallis on 28 November 1722. They were the parents of General Cornwallis, who commanded the British forces in the American Revolution.
 Charles Townshend, 3rd Viscount Townshend of Raynham b. 11 July 1700, d. 12 March 1764
 Hon. Thomas Townshend b. 2 June 1701, d. 21 May 1780
 Hon. William Townshend b. 1702, d. 29 January 1738
 Hon. Roger Townshend b. 5 June 1708, d. 7 August 1760

Secondly, he was married to Dorothy Walpole (1686–1726), sister of Sir Robert Walpole, who is said to haunt Raynham as the Brown Lady of Raynham Hall.

Children with Dorothy Walpole:
 Hon. George Townshend b.1715 d. Aug 1769
 Hon. Augustus Townshend b. 1716 d. 1746.
 Hon. Horatio Townshend b. 1718 d. 1764
 Very Rev. The Hon. Edward Townshend b. 25 October 1719, d. 27 January 1765, Dean of Norwich (1761–1765), Canon of Westminster (1749–1761)
 Hon. Richard Townshend b. 1721 d. at a young age.
 Hon. Dorothy Townshend b.1722 d.1779.
 Hon. Mary Townshend married Lieutenant General Edward Cornwallis(5 Mar 172414 Jan 1776), son of Charles Cornwallis, 4th Baron Cornwallis of Eye and Lady Charlotte Butler, in 1763 

He had nine sons, one of them died at a young age. The eldest son, Charles, the 3rd viscount (1700–1764), was called to the House of Lords in 1723. The second son, Thomas Townshend (1701–1780), was member of parliament for the University of Cambridge from 1727 to 1774; his only son, Thomas Townshend (1733–1800), who was created Baron Sydney in 1783 and Viscount Sydney in 1789, was a secretary of state and Leader of the House of Commons from July 1782 to April 1783, and from December 1783 to June 1789 again a secretary of state, Sydney in New South Wales being named after him; his grandson, John Robert Townshend (1805–1890), the 3rd viscount, was created Earl Sydney in 1874, the titles becoming extinct at his death. Charles Townshend's eldest son by his second wife was George Townshend (1715–1769), who after serving for many years in the navy, became an admiral in 1765. The younger son Edward (1719–1765) became Dean of Norwich

The third viscount had two sons, George, 1st Marquess Townshend, and Charles Townshend.

Townsend was the maternal grandfather of Charles Cornwallis, 1st Marquess Cornwallis.

See also
 Kingdom of Great Britain#George I: 1714–1727

References

Further reading
 Black, Jeremy. "Fresh Light on the Fall of Townshend." Historical Journal 29.1 (1986): 41–64.
 Black, Jeremy. "Additional Light on the Fall of Townshend."  Yale University Library Gazette 63#3 (1989), pp. 132–136 online
 Black, Jeremy. British foreign policy in the age of Walpole (1985).
 Cruickshanks, Eveline. "The Political Management of Sir Robert Walpole, 1720–42." in Jeremy Black, ed., Britain in the Age of Walpole Macmillan Education UK, 1984. 23–43.
 Frey, Linda, and Marsha Frey. "Townshend, Charles, second Viscount Townshend (1674–1738)", Oxford Dictionary of National Biography, 2004 accessed 23 Sept 2017 a scholarly biography
 Plumb, John Harold. Sir Robert Walpole: The King's Minister Vol. 2. Cresset Press, 1960.
 Williams, Basil. The Whig Supremacy 1714–1760 (1939) online edition; summarizes the following in-depth articles; they are online free:
 Williams, Basil. "The Foreign Policy of England under Walpole" The English Historical Review 15#58 (Apr. 1900), pp. 251–276 in JSTOR
"The Foreign Policy of England under Walpole (Continued)" English Historical Review 15#59 (July 1900), pp. 479–494 in JSTOR
 "The Foreign Policy of England under Walpole (Continued)" English Historical Review 59#60 (Oct. 1900), pp. 665–698 in JSTOR
 "The Foreign Policy of England under Walpole" English Historical Review 16#61  (Jan. 1901), pp. 67–83 in JSTOR
 "The Foreign Policy of England under Walpole (Continued)" English Historical Review 16#62  (Apr. 1901), pp. 308–327 in JSTOR
 "The Foreign Policy of England under Walpole (Continued)" English Historical Review 16#53 (July 1901), pp. 439–451 in JSTOR

Sources

|-

1674 births
1738 deaths
17th-century English nobility
18th-century English nobility
People from Raynham, Norfolk
Alumni of King's College, Cambridge
Secretaries of State for the Northern Department
Diplomatic peers
Knights of the Garter
Lord-Lieutenants of Norfolk
Lord Presidents of the Council
British agriculturalists
Charles Townshend
Fellows of the Royal Society
Ambassadors of Great Britain to France
Ambassadors of Great Britain to the Netherlands
3
Lords Lieutenant of Ireland
Leaders of the House of Lords
People educated at Eton College